The Guapiaçú River (sometimes Guapi-Áçu River) is a river of Rio de Janeiro state in southeastern Brazil.
It is a tributary of the Macacu River.

The Guapiaçú River forms part of the eastern boundary of the  Guapi-Guapiaçú Environmental Protection Area, created in 2004.
It rises in the Serra do Mar between Nova Friburgo and Cachoeiras de Macacu.
In its lower reaches it defines the boundary between the municipalities of Cachoeiras de Macacu to the east and Guapimirim to the west.

See also
List of rivers of Rio de Janeiro

References

Sources

Rivers of Rio de Janeiro (state)